Bedros Parian (1873 – 26 August 1896), better known by his nom de guerre Papken Siuni, was an important figure in the Armenian national movement, an Armenian Revolutionary Federation member and the leader, alongside Karekin Pastermadjian (Armen Garo), of the 1896 Ottoman Bank takeover.

Early life 

Bedros Parian was born to a poor family of noble origins in 1873 in the village of Pingian (now Adatepe in Divriği district) near the town of Akn in the Harput Vilayet. Early in his life, he moved to Constantinople where he attended the Getronagan Armenian High School. In Constantinople, he became interested in revolutionary ideologies. During his time at Getronagan High School, he was arrested and served a short prison sentence. After graduating, he joined a naval institute where he found other sympathetic youth and formed an Armenian nationalist group called "Syunik". They eventually merged with the Armenian Revolutionary Federation.

Armenian national movement 

Upon merging with the ARF, he became known for his ability to gather intelligence without being suspected and going unnoticed. On his intelligence missions, he would wear a fez and peasant clothes to remain unnoticed from the Ottoman secret police and paid nationals.

Ottoman Bank takeover and Death 

During the Hamidian massacres, Bedros Parian lost his parents which would make him pursue the national movement even more staunchly. The Ottoman Bank takeover was his brainchild, which he came up with after the murder of his parents. The ARF made Papken Siuni the leader of the operation. He would secure pistols, grenades and other weapons which he would personally give to his comrades who were to be involved in the operation. The night before the takeover, he gave his men a passionate speech stating in Armenian about the Armenian cause and how their blood would not go in vain.

On 26 August 1896, Papken Siuni, alongside Karekin Pastermadjian and other fedayees attacked the Ottoman Bank. Papken Siuni was part of the first wave of attackers. But before he could even go into the bank, a bullet pierced through one of the grenades attached to his chest, causing an explosion which killed him instantly. Despite his brief participation in the takeover, he is often credited as playing a big part in the takeover and the Armenian national movement.

References 

 ARF Lebanon page
 From the Armenian: Mihran Kurdoghlian, Badmoutioun Hayots, C. hador [Armenian History, volume III], Athens, Greece, 1996, pg. 44.

Armenian nationalists
Armenians from the Ottoman Empire
Siuni, Papken
People from Kemaliye
1873 births
1896 deaths